Jason Ryan is an Australian former rugby league footballer who played for the Penrith Panthers, South Sydney Rabbitohs and North Queensland Cowboys in the 1990s.

Playing career
In Round 9 of the 1993 NSWRL season, Ryan made his first grade debut for the Penrith Panthers in their 10–24 loss to the Western Suburbs Magpies. 

After three first grade games with the Penrith club, Ryan joined the South Sydney Rabbitohs in 1994.  Ryan played for Souths in their upset 1994 Tooheys Challenge Cup final victory over Brisbane.

In 1995, Ryan made his official club debut for South Sydney, playing four games that season. In 1997, after playing just two games in 1996 for South Sydney, Ryan joined the North Queensland Cowboys for the 1997 Super League season, playing one game. In 1998, he played for the Wynnum Seagulls in the Queensland Cup.

Statistics

NSWRL/ARL/Super League
 Statistics are correct to the end of the 1997 season

References

Living people
Australian rugby league players
Penrith Panthers players
South Sydney Rabbitohs players
North Queensland Cowboys players
Rugby league wingers
Rugby league five-eighths
Year of birth missing (living people)
Wynnum Manly Seagulls players